The Emergency Relief and Construction Act (ch. 520, enacted July 21, 1932), was the United States's first major-relief legislation, enabled under Herbert Hoover and later adopted and expanded by Franklin D. Roosevelt as part of his New Deal.

The Emergency Relief and Construction Act was an amendment to the Reconstruction Finance Corporation Act which was signed on January 22, 1932. It created the Reconstruction Finance Corporation which released funds for public works projects across the country.  The Brooklyn Navy Yard received an allotment of $880,000, marked for specific projects such as $215,000 for repairs and the maintenance of roofs, waterfront quays and docks, and Yard's railroad system.  The biggest chunk, $855,000, was designated for a major overhaul of the power plant, to put in a new turbo generator, piping, boilers, and other engines.  The Act was designed to be a temporary means of providing employment and all the positions created in the navy yard to service the projects were therefore classified as temporary. In another preview of New Deal spending, the government even authorized the Act funds to start building a number of destroyers in the navy yards.

According to the Department of Housing and Urban Development, "This was the government’s first major involvement in the housing field. The RFC was authorized to make loans to private corporations providing housing for low-income families. Also in 1932, the Federal Home Loan Bank Board was established to make advances on the security of home mortgages and establish a Home Loan Bank System."

References

External links
 
 
 
 

1932 in American law
1932 in the United States
72nd United States Congress
United States federal legislation
Reconstruction Finance Corporation